Captus is a conservative Swedish think-tank that was founded in Gothenburg in 2005. It regularly publish articles mainly in Swedish but also in international media such as The Guardian, Human Events, The Wall Street Journal, FrontPage Magazine and The American Enterprise. Captus also publishes reports on issues ranging from labour market regulations to integration policy, from waste and environmental management to Iranian energy subsidies.

Sources

External links

 Captus
 Captus Journal

2005 establishments in Sweden
Conservatism in Sweden
Libertarianism in Sweden
Libertarian think tanks
Political and economic think tanks based in Europe
Think tanks based in Sweden
Think tanks established in 2005